Zou Shiming (born 18 May 1981) is a Chinese former professional boxer who competed from 2013 to 2017 and held the WBO flyweight title from 2016 to 2017. As an amateur, Zou is China's most successful boxer of all time. In the light-flyweight division, he won three consecutive Olympic medals (bronze in 2004 and gold in 2008 and 2012), as well as three World Amateur Boxing Championships gold medals in 2005, 2007 and 2011.

Amateur career
Zou Shiming competed in his first amateur boxing competition at the 2004 Asian Amateur Boxing Championships and won silver, losing in the final to Noman Karim but qualifying for the 2004 Summer Olympics. At the 2004 Summer Olympics, he won his first match by beating Rau'shee Warren in the round of 32. He lost to eventual champion Yan Bartelemí in the semi-finals and ended up winning bronze. Zou won the 2005 World Amateur Boxing Championships by beating Pál Bedák in the final, becoming the first ever Chinese boxer to win the tournament. At the 2006 Asian Games, Zou won gold by beating Suban Pannon 21–1 in the final match. He repeated his triumph from 2005 at the 2007 World Amateur Boxing Championships, beating David Ayrapetyan early in the tournament and Harry Tanamor in the final; however, Zou had to settle for silver at the 2007 Asian Amateur Boxing Championships, losing in the final against Pürevdorjiin Serdamba.

At the 2008 Summer Olympics, Zou won China's 50th gold medal of the tournament by winning the final of the light flyweight event, winning China's first ever gold medal in Olympic boxing. During the final, Serdamba, his opponent from the final of the 2007 Asian Amateur Boxing Championships, was forced to retire due to a shoulder injury. After Serdamba was not able to continue, Zou burst into tears in compassion for his fellow boxer's injury. Zou did not compete in the 2009 World Amateur Boxing Championships, but he came back to win gold at the 2010 Asian Games. He also won his third straight gold at the 2011 World Amateur Boxing Championships. Zou won gold again at the 2012 Summer Olympics by beating Kaeo Pongprayoon 13–10, but several critics regarded his victory as controversial.

After the 2012 Summer Olympics, Zou decided to make the switch from amateur boxing to professional boxing.

Olympic Games results
Beijing - 2008
 Round of 32: Defeated Eduard Bermúdez (Venezuela) on points, 11-2
 Round of 16: Defeated Nordine Oubaali (France) on points, 3-3
 Quarterfinal: Defeated Birzhan Zhakypov (Kazakhstan) on points, 9-4
 Semifinal: Defeated Patrick Barnes (Ireland) on points, 15-0
 Final: Technical win against Pürevdorjiin Serdamba (Mongolia) 1-0 (won gold medal)

London - 2012
 Round of 32: bye
 Round of 16: Defeated Yosbany Veitia (Cuba) on points, 14-11
 Quarterfinal: Defeated Birzhan Zhakypov (Kazakhstan) on points, 13-10
 Semifinal: Defeated Patrick Barnes (Ireland) on points 15-15
 Final: Defeated Kaeo Pongprayoon (Thailand) on points 13-10 (won gold medal)

World Amateur Championships results
2003
Defeated Yan Bartelemí (Cuba) 22-15
Defeated Rudolf Dydi (Slovakia) 21-9
Defeated Harry Tanamor (Philippines) 21-13
Lost to Sergey Kazakov (Russia) 19-23

2005
Defeated Łukasz Maszczyk (Poland) 18-10
Defeated Salim Salimov (Bulgaria) 22-9
Defeated Yan Bartelemí (Cuba) 12-10
Defeated Sherali Dostiev (Tajikistan) 18-13
Defeated Pál Bedák (Hungary) 31-13

2007
Defeated Constantin Paraschiv (Romania) 15-3
Defeated Birzhan Zhakypov (Kazakhstan) 30-13
Defeated David Ayrapetyan (Russia) 23-6
Defeated Patrick Barnes (Ireland) 22-8
Defeated Nordine Oubaali (France) 16-1
Defeated Harry Tanamor (Philippines) 17-3

2011
Defeated Juan Meddina (Dominican Republic) 17-9
Defeated Istvan Ungvari (Hungary) 12-2
Defeated Mark Barriga (Philippines) 12-5
Defeated Kaew Pongprayoon (Thailand) 14-8
Defeated David Ayrapetyan (Russia) 15-8
Defeated Shin Jong-Hun (South Korea) 20-11

Asian Games results
2006
Defeated Sherali Dostiev (Tajikistan) 16-10
Defeated Sanjay Kisan Kolte (India) RSCO 3
Defeated Hong Moo-won (South Korea) 17-9
Defeated Suban Pannon (Thailand) RSCO 2

2010
Defeated Jasurbek Latipov (Uzbekistan) 9-2
Defeated Hatsanai Phoilevy (Laos) 13-1
Defeated Amnat Ruenroeng (Thailand) 5-2
Defeated Birzhan Zhakypov (Kazakhstan) 9-5

Professional career

Early fights 

After winning gold at the 2012 Summer Olympics, Zou decided to turn professional. On 23 January 2013, he signed a contract with boxing promotion company Top Rank and was subsequently trained by Freddie Roach. Zou debuted on 6 April 2013, beating Eleazar Valenzuela by unanimous decision. Zou's professional debut generated an estimated 300 million viewers in China. After a win over Jesus Ortega, Zou fought on the undercard of Manny Pacquiao vs. Brandon Rios on 23 November 2013, beating Juan Tozcano. He recorded his first knockout win of his professional career on 22 February 2014, beating Yokthong Kokietgym in the seventh round.

World title pursuit

Zou vs. de la Rosa 

On 19 July 2014, Zou beat Luis de la Rosa by unanimous decision with scores of 97–93, 99-91 & 99–91 at the Cotai Arena in Macau, to win his first ever professional title, the WBO International flyweight title. The fight was on the undercard of the world super-bantamweight championship fight between Guillermo Rigondeaux and Sod Kokietgym.

Zou vs. Ruenroeng 
After retaining the title against Prasitsak Phaprom on the undercard of Manny Pacquiao vs. Chris Algieri, Zou fought IBF flyweight champion Amnat Ruenroeng at the Cotai Arena in Macau on March 7, 2015. This marked the seventh straight fight Zou would fight at the venue since turning professional. Like Zou, Ruenroeng also fought at the Olympics, and lost to Zou at the 2010 Asian Games. Ruenroeng shattered Zou's dreams of becoming world champion and gifted him his first professional loss when he scored a unanimous decision win after 12 rounds and retained his title in the process. Roenroeng won the bout comfortably with all three judges scoring it (116-111 x3), despite being controversially knocked down in round 2 as he lost his balance. Each time Zou tried to get on the inside, Ruenroeng used his jab and counterpunch to keep control of the fight. Following the loss, Zou was ranked #7 by the IBF and WBO and #9 by the WBC.

WBO flyweight champion

Zou vs. Phaprom II 
After Zou beat Brazilian boxer Natan Santana Coutinho by technical knockout to win back the WBO International flyweight title, and retained the title at Madison Square Garden in New York City against contender Jozsef Ajtai, he was ranked as the classified contender for the vacant WBO world title vacated by Juan Francisco Estrada, who decided to move up to super flyweight.

On November 5, 2016, in a rematch from November 2014, Zou defeated Prasitsak Phaprom (39-1-2, 24 KOs) via a unanimous decision to win the vacant WBO flyweight title on the Vargas-Pacquiao undercard at the Thomas & Mack Center in Las Vegas. Zou consistently landed quick and effective combinations from the opening bell and used his footwork to avoid punches. A knockdown was recorded in round 2 after Phaprom's gloves touched the canvas after being hit with a hard right. The three judges at ringside scored the fight 120–107, 120-107 and 119-108 all in favour of Zou.

Zou vs. Kimura 
On June 27, 2017, it was announced that Zou would make a voluntary defence of his WBO title against Japanese underdog and WBO #7 Sho Kimura (14-1-2, 7 KOs) on July 28 at the Oriental Sports Center in Shanghai, China. Zou parted ways with promoter Top Rank and decided to promote the fight himself. He decided not to train with his hall of fame trainer Freddie Roach. In a shocking upset, Kimura, who was behind on two scorecards at the start of round 11, knocked Zou out to win the WBO flyweight title. Two judges had the fight 96–94, 97-93 for Zou, whilst the third judge had it 96-94 for Kimura. Zou used his movement throughout the fight which had Kimura chasing him trying to land shots. He landed a right hook then followed by a combination. Zou dropped to the ground after a flurry of punches. He failed to get up, but referee didn't count him out, calling off the fight.

Professional boxing record

Television viewership

China

Personal life
Zou graduated with a master's degree from the Shanghai University of Sport. He has been married to Ran Yingying since 2011 and they have three sons. In 2018, he was hired by East China Normal University as a teacher.

In 2014, Zou made his first acting appearance in the movie Transformers: Age of Extinction.

References

External links

"Zou Shiming", n°20 on Time'''s list of "100 Olympic Athletes To Watch"
"The Boxing Rebellion", in The New Yorker - Feb 4th, 2008
Shiming Zou - Profile, News Archive & Current Rankings at Box.Live

1981 births
Living people
People from Zunyi
Sportspeople from Guizhou
Chinese male boxers
Light-flyweight boxers
Olympic boxers of China
Olympic gold medalists for China
Olympic bronze medalists for China
Olympic medalists in boxing
Medalists at the 2004 Summer Olympics
Medalists at the 2008 Summer Olympics
Medalists at the 2012 Summer Olympics
Boxers at the 2004 Summer Olympics
Boxers at the 2008 Summer Olympics
Boxers at the 2012 Summer Olympics
Asian Games medalists in boxing
Asian Games gold medalists for China
Boxers at the 2002 Asian Games
Boxers at the 2006 Asian Games
Boxers at the 2010 Asian Games
AIBA World Boxing Championships medalists
Medalists at the 2006 Asian Games
Medalists at the 2010 Asian Games